HMS Zealous was one of the three ships (the others being  and ) forming the second group of wooden steam battleships selected in 1860 for conversion to ironclads. This was done in response to the perceived threat to Britain offered by the large French ironclad building programme. The ship was ordered to the West Coast of Canada after she was completed to represent British interests in the Eastern Pacific Ocean. Zealous became the flagship for the Pacific Station for six years until she was relieved in 1872. She was refitted upon her arrival and subsequently became the guard ship at Southampton until she was paid off in 1875. The ship was in reserve until she was sold for scrap in 1886.

Design and description
HMS Zealous was given a straight stem and a rounded stern, but her hull was otherwise unmodified from her original form; it had been found that lengthening the hull, as was done in the earlier , led to longitudinal weakness. Her conversion to a central battery ironclad therefore cost less than that of any of her contemporaries, though this was offset with a shorter battery and therefore a less effective broadside. She also carried less armour than the earlier class, and was nearly a knot slower; however, as she was built to serve in distant waters, and not expected to face opposing ships of significant force, these shortcomings were thought acceptable.

The ship had a draught of  forward and  aft. She displaced .

Propulsion
Zealous had a simple horizontal 2-cylinder horizontal return connecting-rod steam engine driving a single four-bladed,  propeller.

Armament
All of the available  and  guns had already been earmarked for other, more powerful ships. Zealous therefore received an armament of  guns, which were deemed adequate for her expected service activity, and which, indeed, she retained for the whole of her active career. She was the only battleship ever to have a uniform armament of this calibre, and she, and her half sister , were the only Victorian ironclads to retain their original armament unchanged through their entire active careers.

Zealous was armed with twenty 7-inch rifled muzzle-loading guns. Four of these guns were mounted on the upper deck as chase guns, two each fore and aft. It was credited with the nominal ability to penetrate  armour.

Armour

Service history
HMS Zealous was laid down on 26 October 1859 as a wooden two-deck, 90-gun ship of the line by Pembroke Royal Dockyard, but her construction was suspended pending experience with the conversion of her half-sisters of the Prince Consort class to broadside ironclads. The Admiralty ordered on 2 July 1862 that she be cut down one deck and converted to an armoured frigate for the price of £239,258. The ship was launched on 7 March 1864 and commissioned in September 1866, but was not completed until 4 October 1866.

Upon her arrival the ship became the flagship, and reached her operational base at Esquimalt in July 1867 (Esquimalt was the headquarters of the Pacific Station); she remained moored there, at the end of a telegraph link with Britain, until April 1869. During this time her only sea service was for gunnery practice on two days every quarter. In January 1870 she picked up a fresh crew at Panama brought out by the two-decker . After six years on station she was relieved by Revenge as flagship and started for home. Her bottom had not been cleaned since she had left Great Britain and she could only make a maximum of  under sail or steam so her return voyage took five months. Zealous struck a rock while sailing through the English Narrows in the southwestern coast of Chile, but was only slightly damaged. She was refitted in Plymouth in April 1873 and then became guard ship at Southampton until 1875, when she was paid off. The ship was placed in reserve in Portsmouth until sold for scrap in September 1886.

As coal was extremely expensive on the West Coast of the Americas, HMS Zealous generally used her sails and covered more miles under sail than any of the other Victorian sailing ironclads, and in her whole career never once travelled in company with another ironclad. She was also the first British ironclad to sail further from Britain than the Mediterranean.

Notes

Footnotes

References

 
 
 
 

 

Bulwark-class battleships (1859)
Ships built in Pembroke Dock
1864 ships
Victorian-era battleships of the United Kingdom